Extreme Days is a 2001 comedy-romance film about four boys on a roadtrip that they have been planning their whole lives. Their dreams are to participate in many extreme sports, but they are stopped short due to many circumstances.

Plot
Four childhood friends, Will, Brian, Corey, and Matt, have had a dream since they were kids to surf, skate, and snowboard across California. After graduating from junior college, they decide to make the trip, but have to save money first. Through their jobs life-guarding children's swimming pools and working at Turkish restaurants they manage to save $847.53, enough to cross California in their Joyota; a Jeep refitted with a Toyota engine. They decide to go to Mexico where they surf at Larosarita. Corey receives a phone call and is told of the unexpected death of his grandfather, "Grandpa G.", who left him an inheritance including a car, which Corey must travel to Yakima, Washington to pick up. The friends, who all knew Grandpa G., accompany him, counting on being able to pay for the return trip with the inheritance money.

On the way, the group runs into Matt's beautiful cousin Jessie, who needs a ride to Seattle because her car has broken down. Brian is immediately infatuated with her, but she avoids him, only increasing his desire for her. Corey makes a bet with Brian that he will not be able to get Jessie to do one thing he wants her to do by the end of the trip. As the trip continues, Jessie and Brian get closer, but Jessie has difficulties trusting Brian and his intentions toward her due to past experiences. She knew all along about the bet, but because of her convictions and some harsh words from Brian, she decides to leave, although it hurts her.

In low spirits, the boys arrive at the home of Grandma G in Washington, only to find that the car Corey has inherited is a junk car. Unable to get home, they are forced to sell the car to get money for the trip home. In a newspaper, Matt sees five tickets to Alaska on sale for $500. With the help of Grandma G, they sell the car online for $1,500.

Brian knows he messed up with Jessie and regrets his behaviour. Hoping to win her back, Brian and the others head to the University of Washington where she is giving a freshman orientation. Brian apologizes for what he did, telling Jessie he's never known anyone like her and that she woke him up. He asks her to come with them, but she tearfully says that she cannot. Matt gives her a plane ticket before the four friends leave. Brian waits at the airport for Jessie hopefully, but she does not come. As he takes his seat, his phone starts ringing; it is Jessie, who is sitting in the back of the plane.

Cast
 Dante Basco- Corey Ng 
 Ryan Browning- Brian Davidson 
 A.J. Buckley- Will Davidson
 Derek Hamilton- Matt McKeague 
 Cassidy Rae- Jessie Jacobs

Reception
Extreme Days was mostly panned by critics, receiving an aggregate score of 43 on Rotten Tomatoes,  but only garnering a score of 17 at Metacritic ("extreme dislike or disgust") and ranking No. 97 on the all-time low scores (as of December 4, 2008).

Soundtrack

The film's soundtrack features songs by alternative Christian artists.
 "Extreme Days" - TobyMac
 "We're Takin' Over" - Jamie Rowe
 "Loss For Words" - Tait
 "Downhill Games" - Klaus Badelt
 "One Time" - Earthsuit
 "Good Life" - Audio Adrenaline
 "Song X" - East West
 "King Planet" - Fold Zandura
 "A.M."- PAX217
 "I Want To Know You" - Sonicflood
 "Selah" - P.O.D.
 "Superfan" - Fanmail
 "God Is Love" - John Reuben (feat. TobyMac)
 "Alex" - .rod laver
 "Heartbeat" - Bleach
 "Entertaining Angels" - Newsboys
 "Jessie and Brian" - Klaus Badelt
 "Come on to the Future" - Skillet

References

External links
 
 Metacritic
 Hollywoodjesus

2001 films
Films about evangelicalism
Films shot in Oregon
Films shot in Portland, Oregon
Films shot in Washington (state)
Films set in Seattle
Films set in Washington (state)
Films scored by Klaus Badelt
2000s English-language films